Saint-Ludger is a municipality in the Le Granit Regional County Municipality in Beauce, Quebec, Canada, on the Canada–United States border. Population is 1,074 as of 2021.

The municipality of Saint-Ludger was created in 1998 from the amalgamation of the village of Saint-Ludger, the municipality of Risborough and the township of Gayhurst-Partie-Sud-Est. The first settlers arrived in the area before 1863. It is named in honour of Ludger of Utrecht, the first bishop of Münster in the 9th century.

References

External links

 Municipalité de Saint-Ludger (in French)
Commission de toponymie du Québec
Ministère des Affaires municipales, des Régions et de l'Occupation du territoire

Municipalities in Quebec
Designated places in Quebec
Incorporated places in Estrie
Le Granit Regional County Municipality